Johnny Miller (born 1947) is an American former professional golfer.

Johnny Miller may also refer to:
Johnny Miller (racing driver) (born 1965), American racecar driver
Johnny Miller (footballer) (1950–2016), English soccer player
Johnny Miller (Hidden Palms), fictional character
Johnny Miller (aviator) (1905–2008), American aircraft pilot
Johnny R. Miller, Assistant Adjutant General of the Illinois Army National Guard
Johnny Miller, bassist with the King Cole Trio

See also
Jonny Lee Miller (born 1972), British actor
John Miller (disambiguation)
Jonathan Miller (disambiguation)